Sorensen's leaf-nosed bat (Hipposideros sorenseni) is a species of bat in the family Hipposideridae that is endemic to Indonesia.

Taxonomy
Sorensen's leaf-nosed bat was described as a new species in 1993 by Darrell Kitchener and I. Maryanto. The holotype had been collected in 1976 by Bapak Sudarmanu in Gua Kramat near the town of Pangandaran in West Java. The eponym for the species name "sorenseni" is Kurt Sorensen for his support of the Western Australian Museum and Bogor Zoology Museum's research in Indonesia.

Description
It is highly colonial, roosting in caves in large aggregations.

Range and status
During the day it roosts in caves. As of 2021, Sorensen's leaf-nosed bat was evaluated as an endangered species by the IUCN.Its cave roosts are protected, but if disturbance were to occur, its populations could rapidly decline, becoming critically endangered or extinct. Possible threats to this species include mining for limestone.

References

Hipposideros
Bats of Indonesia
Bat, Sorensen's leaf-nosed
Vulnerable fauna of Asia
Mammals described in 1993
Taxa named by Darrell Kitchener
Taxonomy articles created by Polbot